5-MAPDB (1-(2,3-dihydrobenzofuran-5-yl)-N-methylpropan-2-amine) is a chemical compound which acts as an entactogenic drug. It is structurally related to drugs like 5-APDB and 5-MAPB, which have similar effects to MDMA and have been used as recreational drugs. 5-MAPDB has been studied to determine its pharmacological activity, and was found to be a relatively selective serotonin releaser, though with weaker actions as a releaser of other monoamines and 5-HT2 receptor family agonist, similar to older compounds such as 5-APDB.

Legality
5-MAPDB was banned in the UK in June 2013 as a temporary class drug along with 9 other related compounds, despite having never been sold as a street drug itself. This was due to concerns that it would have similar effects to drugs such as 5-APB that had been widely sold already, and 5-MAPDB might therefore be likely to become used recreationally also, if it were not banned preemptively.

See also 
 5-MAPDI
 6-MAPDB
 IBF5MAP

References 

Methamphetamines
5-Benzofuranethanamines
Designer drugs
Entactogens and empathogens